The Powerpuff Girls is an American superhero animated television series created by animator Craig McCracken and produced by Hanna-Barbera (later Cartoon Network Studios) for Cartoon Network and distributed by Warner Bros. Domestic Television Distribution. The show centers on Blossom, Bubbles, and Buttercup, three kindergarten-aged girls with superpowers. The girls all live in the fictional city of Townsville with their father and creator, a scientist named Professor Utonium, and are frequently called upon by the city's mayor to help fight nearby criminals and other enemies using their powers.

While attending his second year at CalArts in 1992, series creator Craig McCracken created a short film, Whoopass Stew!, about a trio of child superheroes called the Whoopass Girls, which was only shown at festivals. Following a name change to Powerpuff Girls, McCracken submitted his student film to Cartoon Network, who aired the series' refined pilot in its animation showcase program World Premiere Toons on February 20, 1995, along with its follow-up, "Crime 101", which aired on January 28, 1996. Network executives gave McCracken the greenlight for a full series, which debuted as a Cartoon Cartoon on November 18, 1998.

The Powerpuff Girls aired on Cartoon Network for six seasons, three specials, and a feature film, with the final episode airing on March 25, 2005. A total of 78 episodes were aired in addition to two shorts, a Christmas special, the film, a tenth anniversary special, and a special episode using CGI technology. Various spin-off media include an anime, three CD soundtracks, a home video collection, comic books, a series of video games, a 2016 reboot series, and an upcoming second reboot, as well as various licensed merchandise. The series has been nominated for six Emmy Awards, nine Annie Awards, and a Kids' Choice Award during its run.

Premise 
The show revolves around the adventures of three kindergarten-aged girls with an array of various superpowers: Blossom (pink), Bubbles (blue), and Buttercup (green). The plot of an episode is usually some humorous variation of standard superhero and tokusatsu shows, with the girls using their powers to defend their town from villains and giant monsters. In addition, the girls have to deal with the normal issues that young children face, such as sibling rivalries, loose teeth, personal hygiene, going to school, bed wetting, or dependence on a security blanket. Episodes often contain hidden references to older pop culture (especially noticeable in the episode "Meet the Beat Alls", which is a homage to the Beatles). The cartoon always tries to keep different ideas within each episode with some small tributes and parodies thrown in.

The show is set mainly in the city of Townsville, USA. Townsville is depicted as a major American city, with a cityscape consisting of several major skyscrapers. In his review of The Powerpuff Girls Movie, movie critic Bob Longino of The Atlanta Journal-Constitution said, "the intricate drawings emanate 1950s futuristic pizzazz like a David Hockney scenescape," and that the show is "one of the few American creations that is both gleeful pop culture and exquisite high art."

Episodes

Characters 

As depicted in the opening sequence of each episode, the Powerpuff Girls Blossom, Bubbles, and Buttercup were created by Professor Utonium in an attempt to create the "perfect little girl" using a mixture of "sugar, spice, and everything nice". However, he accidentally spilled a mysterious substance called "Chemical X" into the mixture, creating three girls and granting all three superpowers including flight, superhuman strength, superhuman speed, superhuman senses, nigh-invulnerability, x-ray vision, red heat vision, energy projection, space survivability, and thermal resistance. In the original pilot, the accidental substance was a can of "Whoopass", which was replaced by "Chemical X" in the aired version.

The three girls all have oval-shaped heads, abnormally large eyes inspired by Margaret Keane's art, flat feet and stubby arms and legs, and lack of noses, ears, fingers, toes and necks. McCracken preferred them to look more animated rather than going for a "realistic" look, meaning fewer body parts were needed. Blossom, Bubbles, and Buttercup normally wear dresses that match the colors of their eyes with black stripes, as well as white tights and black Mary Janes. The closing theme to the cartoon offers a nutshell description of the three Powerpuff Girls' personalities: Blossom, commander and the leader. Bubbles, she is the joy and the laughter. Buttercup, she is the toughest fighter.
 Blossom (voiced by Cathy Cavadini) is the self-proclaimed leader of the Powerpuff Girls. Her personality ingredient is "everything nice", her signature color is pink, and she has long red-orange hair with a red bow. She was named for having spoken freely and honestly to the Professor shortly after her creation as shown in The Powerpuff Girls Movie. She is often seen as the most level-headed, and composed member of the group and also strong and determined. Her unique abilities include Ice breath, microscopic vision, lightning bolts, and advanced intelligence; she is also an exceptional leader, master strategist, and apt planner.
 Bubbles (voiced by Tara Strong in the series, and by Kath Soucie in the What a Cartoon! episodes) is the "softest and sweetest" of the three. Her signature color is blue, her personality ingredient is "sugar", and she has blonde hair in pigtails. Bubbles is seen as kind and very sweet but she is also capable of extreme rage and can fight monsters just as well as her sisters can. Her best friend is a stuffed octopus doll she calls "Octi", and she also loves animals. She exhibits the ability to both understand multiple languages and communicate with various animals; her unique powers are projecting powerful sonic screams, and creating a shockwave of thunder with a single clap from her hands.
 Buttercup (voiced by E. G. Daily) is described as a "tough hotheaded tomboy". Her personality ingredient is "spice", her signature color is green, and she has short black hair in a flip. She loves to get dirty, fights hard and plays rough; she does not plan and is all action. Her unique powers are curling her tongue, spinning into a tornado, and creating fireballs by rubbing her hands together 'till smoke comes out which forms a flaming ball that she throws at an opponent. McCracken originally wanted to name the character "Bud" until a friend suggested the name Buttercup.

Production 

During Craig McCracken's first year in the character animation program of CalArts, he wanted to produce an animated short film based on a wrestler-type character he made called "El Fuego". In June 1991, he drew three girls with large eyes, visually inspired by the paintings of Margaret Keane, on a small sheet of orange construction paper as a birthday card design for his brother. Looking for some "diversity and balance" in the drawing, he had created a blonde, a redhead, and a brunette. He liked how "cute" they looked and turned them into superheroes, thus replacing the aforementioned wrestler. The following year, the girls starred on McCracken's animated short Whoopass Stew! The Whoopass Girls in: A Sticky Situation. Initially, McCracken wanted to animate all four Whoopass Girls shorts, but only one was produced. McCracken's shorts were selected to be shown at Spike and Mike's Sick and Twisted Festival of Animation in 1994.

While he was working on 2 Stupid Dogs in 1992, McCracken's Whoopass Girls short was picked up for a series by Cartoon Network. The name Whoopass was dropped for inclusion as part of the What a Cartoon! animated shorts showcase. McCracken explained that Cartoon Network executives believed no one would make a children's show with the word "ass" in it, so the title changed to The Powerpuff Girls and the "can of whoopass" was renamed "Chemical X". McCracken's new short, entitled "The Powerpuff Girls in: Meat Fuzzy Lumpkins", aired as part the network's World Premiere Toon-In on February 20, 1995. The short was not as popular as Dexter's Laboratory, a project McCracken and former classmate Genndy Tartakovsky (who also directed many episodes of Powerpuff Girls) worked on together; being the most popular of the shorts, Dexter's Laboratory was the first to be greenlit by the network. Furthermore, McCracken's cartoon didn't do well with a test audience composed by 11-year-old boys; "They were saying, 'This is stupid, little girls can’t be heroes'", he recalled in 1999. They also found the girls' designs to be disturbing, which caused McCracken to panic and attempt to redesign them in a more realistic style. However, Cartoon Network executive Mike Lazzo convinced McCracken to stay true to his original vision, and allowed him to produce a second Powerpuff Girls short titled "Crime 101", which aired on What a Cartoon! in early 1996. Veteran ABC announcer Ernie Anderson, who narrated the pilot episodes and died of cancer in 1997, was replaced by Tom Kenny when it became a series.

Following the second short, Cartoon Network picked up The Powerpuff Girls for a regular animated series. McCracken said that the show did not go through a large development process, but he was adviced to change the name of the three main characters to Pink, Blue and Green, since the network executives found it hard to differentiate them by Blossom, Bubbles and Buttercup. Instead, he put together a bible for the show, explaining the essential aspects of the characters. The Powerpuff Girls series debuted on November 18, 1998, and was the highest-rated premiere in Cartoon Network's history at the time. During its run, the series consistently scored the highest rating for an original series each week for the network across a wide range of demographics—from young children to adults. In October 2000, Cartoon Network credited the series for its Friday night prime time ratings win among cable networks. By the end of 2000, merchandising based on the series encompassed a whole variety of products, including T-shirts, toys, video games, lunchboxes, and dishware. Concerning the show's success, Craig McCracken has stated, "I thought it would get on Cartoon Network and college kids would watch it and there would be a few random T-shirts out there in the rave scene or in record shops. But I had no idea that it would take off to this extent." The cost per each episode was $500,000. A theatrical film based on the show, The Powerpuff Girls Movie, was also commissioned that year and was released July 3, 2002. The film received positive reviews from critics but was a commercial failure, earning $16 million worldwide against its $11 million budget. The production of the film also marked the series' switch from traditional cel animation to the digital ink and paint technique.  

Following the series' fourth season, the closing of Hanna-Barbera Productions and the death of its executive William Hanna in 2001, along with the muted reception to The Powerpuff Girls Movie, McCracken left the series to focus on developing his next animated series for the network, Foster's Home for Imaginary Friends, leaving Chris Savino to take his place while production of The Powerpuff Girls was moved to Cartoon Network Studios. The show's last original run episode was on March 25, 2005; in all, six seasons were made. Cartoon Network had offered to give McCracken and Savino a seventh season of the series, but they believed six was enough, and that the series had run its course. Much of the people who worked on the new seasons also worked on seasons 3 and 4 of Dexter's Laboratory, but included other new crew members, such as Thurop Van Orman, who went on to create The Marvelous Misadventures of Flapjack in 2008.

All of the original episodes were hand-drawn and produced at the Korean studio Rough Draft Studios, except the What a Cartoon! shorts, with the first one being animated at Animal House in Japan and the second being animated at Fil Cartoons in the Philippines. James L. Venable, Thomas Chase, & Steve Rucker composed the opening theme of the series, and Scottish band Bis performed the ending theme song, as played during the credits. The opening theme uses a sped-up drum break sample of "Funky Drummer" performed by Clyde Stubblefield.

Tenth anniversary special 
In August 2008, McCracken revealed on his DeviantArt account, as had been announced in that year's Comic Con, that he was working with Cartoon Network on a new half-hour Powerpuff Girls special to celebrate the series' tenth anniversary. Titled "The Powerpuff Girls Rule!!!", it aired on the Pan-Euro Cartoon Network on November 29, 2008, during the Powerpuff Girls Birthday Marathon, and in the United States on January 19, 2009, as part of its 10th anniversary marathon. Unlike previous episodes of the series, the anniversary special was animated using Adobe Flash at Cartoon Network Studios. It also provides a glimpse of Sara Bellum's face as an easter egg, which at the time could be captured with a TiVo digital video recorder. Originally an idea for season 4, the special was meant to be the final episode of the series, but Cartoon Network was against ending their series openly at the time. In March 2012, the series returned to Cartoon Network in reruns on the revived block, Cartoon Planet.

2014 special 

On January 28, 2013, a CGI special titled Powerpuff Girls: Dance Pantsed was announced to premiere that year, though it was later delayed to January 20, 2014. Former Beatle Ringo Starr promoted the special on Cartoon Network singing a new original song "I Wish I Was a Powerpuff Girl" with previews leading up to the airdate. Ringo also voiced a new character named Fibonacci Sequins in the episode. The special was directed by Dave Smith, who directed episodes for the series in the past, and featured the original cast members reprising their roles. This Powerpuff Girls special marked the first time that series creator Craig McCracken had no input. The episode's plot has Mojo Jojo kidnap Fibonacci along with an opera singer and a badger. The girls rescue all of them, and the Powerpuff Girls defeat Mojo yet again. Not deterred, he then goes on to invent an evil video game called "Dance Pants R-EVILution" (a parody of the video game Dance Dance Revolution) to take over Townsville. Common Sense Media gave the special 3/5 stars citing the "tasteful update of the original animation style" however recommends it for older kids around the age of 7. Geeked Out Nation gave the show a B rank and described it as "...a good special with the return of the characters that many of us grew up [with]", while they said that the special has few flaws. Den of Geek gave the special a 2.5 out 5 said "The Powerpuff reboot needs those paddles to jump-start it. I want more. But I want better."

Reception

Critical reception 

In a 2000 Entertainment Weekly review, Marc Bernardin complimented the show on its "spot-on pop-culture acumen" and "unparalleled sense of fun", giving it a warm welcome from earlier "lame" superhero cartoons that he grew up with. Peter Marks of The New York Times noted the show's use of adult humor and pop culture references, declaring it "the sort of playful satire that can appeal as much to a viewer of 37 as 7." Joly Herman of Common Sense Media described the show as a "cute, highly stylized series thrills the senses with its strange characters, funny situations, and lots of lowbrow humor". She went on to say, however, that the show does go from innocent to violent in no time and that there is not much protecting young viewers against the violent undertones. Robert Lloyd of the LA Times said that the series might be "transgressive" based on little violence, but "also cute." In another review, he had called it "perfectly drawn, perfectly written and perfectly voiced." TV Guide chose the Powerpuff Girls as No. 13 in a list of the 50 Greatest cartoon characters of all time.

IGN ranked the series 18th in its Top 25 Primetime Animated Series of All Time list in 2006. Delta Express promoted the series by having a Boeing 737-232 jet painted with a special livery featuring the characters Blossom, Bubbles, and Buttercup on its exterior. The plane's inaugural flight was held at Logan International Airport in Boston, Massachusetts, on July 17, 2000. In 2002 the aircraft was repainted with a different Powerpuff Girls theme to promote The Powerpuff Girls Movie. The Powerpuff Girls series has won two Primetime Emmys, two Annie Awards, and including those four wins, has been nominated a total of sixteen times for various awards.

Awards and nominations

Merchandise and media

Anime and manga 

In April 2005, plans for a Japanese anime series based on the cartoon, Demashita! Powerpuff Girls Z, were announced. The series premiered in Japan the following year with 52 half-hour episodes, airing each Saturday from July 1 to December 23, 2006, and from January 6 to June 30, 2007. Powerpuff Girls Z deviates from the original series in terms of genre and animation style. The characters feature three junior high school students Momoko Akatsutsumi (Hyper Blossom), Miyako Gotokuji (Rolling Bubbles), and Kaoru Matsubara (Powered Buttercup) as the three heroes. McCracken told NPR that he had little involvement in this version: "I said, well, as long you keep that core foundation the same, feel free to reinterpret or re-imagine it in a way that you feel is going to better play in your marketplace [...] once we did the initial development on it, I kind of gave them my blessing and said, you guys can go off and make this show [...] I was really just there in the initial conception of it." A manga adaptation, illustrated by Shiho Komiyuno, was serialized in Shueisha's Ribon magazine between June 2006 and July 2007.

Comics and books 
From 2000 to 2006, DC published a series of seventy comics based on the television show. Golden Books also published a series of Powerpuff Girls-themed activity books and storybooks, including one written and illustrated by Craig McCracken, titled Big, Terrible Trouble?. From 2013 to 2017, IDW Publishing published a range of comics based on the series. In 2014, IDW published a variant cover which showed aged-up versions of Powerpuff Girls with breasts and dressed in latex. The cover was designed by an artist working for Cartoon Network who was "thinking of it more along the lines of 'female empowerment' than the kind of thing you guys are talking about". Cartoon Network said in a statement: "We recognise some fans' reaction to the cover and, as such, will no longer be releasing it at comic book shops."

Film 

The Powerpuff Girls Movie was released in the United States on July 3, 2002, by Warner Bros. Pictures. The movie, a prequel to the series, tells the story of how the Powerpuff Girls were created, and how Mojo Jojo became a supervillain. The movie received a rating of 63% at Rotten Tomatoes, and received some criticism for the violence involved. In all, the movie grossed $16 million worldwide with an $11 million budget.

Live-action 
On August 24, 2020, a live-action television series based on The Powerpuff Girls was announced to be in development at The CW. According to Variety, it would depict Blossom, Bubbles and Buttercup as "disillusioned twentysomethings" resentful at losing their childhood to fighting crime and faced with the choice of reuniting "when the world needs them more than ever." The project, produced by Warner Bros. Television Studios, is written by Heather Regnier and Diablo Cody, who may also serve as executive producers with Greg Berlanti, Sarah Schechter and David Madden.  Craig McCracken is not involved; however, he declared his liking of Berlanti's superhero shows and admitted he is "curious" to see what they do with their adaptation. Genndy Tartakovsky, who directed and produced several episodes of the original show, also expressed a similar sentiment, suggesting that the idea was "strong" and could work if there's "good people attached to it".

A pilot was officially ordered on February 9, 2021, and Maggie Kiley was hired as the director. Variety later reported that Chloe Bennet, Dove Cameron and Yana Perrault were cast as Blossom, Bubbles, and Buttercup. On March 30, 2021, following the title change to Powerpuff, Donald Faison was cast in the role of Professor "Drake" Utonium. On April 1, Nicholas Podany was cast as Joseph "Jojo" Mondel Jr., the son of Mojo Jojo. On April 7, production on the pilot began. On April 9, Robyn Lively was cast as Sara Bellum and Tom Kenny was confirmed to be reprising his role as the Narrator from the original series. On May 24, The CW announced that the pilot would be reworked off-cycle, with the cast and crew remaining on board. The script was later leaked that day, to overwhelmingly negative reviews on social media. Mark Pedowitz, the head of The CW, stated that the script would be largely rewritten. On August 11, Bennet dropped out of the project due to scheduling conflicts. As of May 2022, it is still in "some stage" of redevelopment.

Music 

Three CD soundtracks were officially released for the series. The first, entitled Heroes & Villains, features original songs about the Powerpuff Girls characters by a number of artists, including the new wave group Devo, Bis, The Apples in Stereo and Frank Black. The first album did well, topping the Billboards children's music chart for six weeks. Another album entitled The City of Soundsville features electronica-style character themes and also did well with critics. The third album, entitled Power Pop, features a more teen-oriented variety of pop songs. This third and final album was considered a "big disappointment" and was not received as well as the previous albums. The British girl group Sugababes also released a song called "Angels with Dirty Faces" to promote The Powerpuff Girls Movie. The song received generally positive reviews from critics, and peaked at number seven on the UK Singles Chart. The music video hearkens to "Nano of the North", an episode from the fourth season of The Powerpuff Girls, in which each Sugababes member portrays a Powerpuff Girl.

Parodies 
A crossover parody of The Powerpuff Girls and 2 Broke Girls was done in the second season of Cartoon Network's TV series MAD, known as "2 Broke Powerpuff Girls". The episode, which aired on January 30, 2012, is of Bubbles and Buttercup, who are broke and work for "Him" in a diner after the show got placed on permanent hiatus. Tara Strong (Bubbles) and Tom Kane ("Him") reprised their roles here. The MAD episode with the parody ranked #26/30 for the week with 1.903 million viewers.

Toys 
From 1999 to 2002, Trendmasters made Powerpuff Girls dolls and action figures. The franchise made nearly $1 billion in retail sales by 2002 according to Cartoon Network. From August 21 to October 1, 2000, Subway promoted the series with four toys in their kids' meals. A set of six kids' meal toys was available as part of an April 2001 Dairy Queen promotion, which also included a sweepstakes offering the Powerpuff Girls VHS Boogie Frights. Jack in the Box released six Powerpuff Girls toys in July 2002 as a tie-in for The Powerpuff Girls Movie. On February 10, 2003, Burger King began a four-week promotion featuring The Powerpuff Girls and Dragon Ball Z toys as well as special codes to redeem online for Cartoon Network's Cartoon Orbit. In the United Kingdom the characters of Buttercup and Mojo Jojo were given away in Kellogg's cereal boxes as part of the Cartoon Network Wobble Heads in 2003.

Video games 

Several video games were made for this show all being action in genre. The Powerpuff Girls: Bad Mojo Jojo, released on November 14, 2000, follows Blossom as she tries to beat Mojo Jojo. The game was called "simple and boring" by GameSpot and was a failure critically. The Powerpuff Girls: Paint the Townsville Green, another game released in November 2000, follows Buttercup as she fights crime. The Powerpuff Girls: Battle HIM follows Bubbles in her fight against HIM and was released in February 2001. The Powerpuff Girls: Chemical X-traction was released in October 2001, where the girls battle enemies in a variety of settings in order to reclaim Chemical X and track down Mojo Jojo, who fed the material to all the villains in Townsville. IGN gave the game a positive review while giving the PSone version a 2.0/10 bad review. The Powerpuff Girls: Relish Rampage was released in November 2002. All three girls are playable in a 3D world, and the game received mixed reviews. The Powerpuff Girls: Mojo Jojo A-Go-Go released in 2001 centers around the name of the Powerpuff Girls' mission to stop Mojo Jojo and his minions. The game received mixed reviews. The Powerpuff Girls: HIM and Seek was released in 2002 where the girls battle their variety of enemies through Townsville while on a scavenger hunt. The game received mostly positive reviews. PC games were also made for the series. These include: The Powerpuff Girls: Mojo Jojo Clone Zone, The Powerpuff Girls: Princess Snorebucks, The Powerpuff Girls: Mojo Jojo's Pet Project, and The Powerpuff Girls: Gamesville.

See also 
 Cartoon Cartoons
 List of female action heroes
 List of works produced by Hanna-Barbera Productions

Notes

References

External links 

  (archive)
 
 
 

The Powerpuff Girls mass media
1990s American animated television series
1990s American superhero comedy television series
1998 American television series debuts
2000s American animated television series
2000s American superhero comedy television series
2005 American television series endings
American children's animated action television series
American children's animated adventure television series
American children's animated comedy television series
American children's animated fantasy television series
American children's animated superhero television series
Animated television series about children
Animated television series about sisters
Annie Award winners
Cartoon Cartoons
Cartoon Network original programming
Television series by Cartoon Network Studios
English-language television shows
Animated superheroine television shows
Anime-influenced Western animated television series
Television shows adapted into comics
Television shows adapted into films
Television shows adapted into video games
Television shows set in the United States
Television series by Hanna-Barbera
Television series by Rough Draft Studios
Television series created by Craig McCracken
Toonami